Grandpa Graf's (also known as Graf's Root Beer, Graf's, or Gran'pa Graf's) is a carbonated soft drink that can presently be purchased in eastern and northern Wisconsin groceries.  The beverage is a root beer flavored drink that originated in 1873 from John Graf.

History
The origins of Grandpa Graf's root beer date back to 1873, when John Graf Sr first brewed the root beer and beer on S. 22nd Street and West Greenfield Avenue. in Milwaukee. In the 1930s, Graf's moved to S. 41st Street and W. Greenfield Ave. in West Milwaukee.
In the early years,  Graf then formed his own company, Graf Beverages, which produced a variety of soft drinks.  Graf continued to brew soft drinks, but his root beer is remembered the most. Graf's image is still on the can of root beer. His legacy was passed onto his son after his death in 1930, when his daughter, Sylvia Graf, assumed presidency of the company. When she died in 1963, Lawrie O. Graf took over the company. Lawrie Graf was known for his creative engineering skills and his education in chemistry at Marquette University, and helped the company achieve a national status. Lawrie Graf continued to run the company until 1968, when he sold the company to P & V Atlas.

P & V Atlas  sold Graf products to Canada Dry, which, in turn, sold Graf to A. J. Canfield in 1984. Canfield was subsequently purchased by Select Beverages, which was later purchased by the Dr Pepper Snapple Group.

Availability
Grandpa Graf's is currently sold in northern, eastern, and southern Wisconsin (most abundant in Milwaukee). Canfield ships it to Minnesota, Michigan, and Chicago.

The Grandpa
In its early days, Grandpa Graf's was called "Graf's Root Beer". Lawrie Graf renamed it "Grandpa Graf's" and gave it the logo of John Graf Senior's face. He enlisted the aid of cartoonist Sid Stone to create the caricature of his grandfather.

The soda was also produced in glass bottles, which carried the same image that is on the can today. The glass bottled root beer was not as popular as the canned products.

Achievements
Grandpa Graf's was known in the 1940s to 1960s for its "new" styles and flavors. According to a 1946 news report, Graf's was producing eight freight car loads of carbonated bottled water or soda every day. Grandpa Graf's was at its peak in the mid- to late-1950s.  The company was among the first to use flat-top cans and also introduced sugar-free sodas. It was one of the first to use the quart bottle, also known as the "family" size bottle, and was one of the first to experiment with the twist-cap bottle.  Graf's won awards in the 1940s, 1950s, and 1960s.

1873 introductions
Root beer
American soft drinks
Keurig Dr Pepper brands
Cuisine of Wisconsin